is a Japanese manga artist, responsible for artwork in First Love Sisters and the manga adaptation of Princess Tutu.

References

External links
 

Living people
Manga artists
Year of birth missing (living people)
Place of birth missing (living people)